William Coleman (February 14, 1766 – July 13, 1829) was the first editor of The New York Evening Post (today known as the New York Post), chosen by founder Alexander Hamilton.

Background
Coleman was born in Boston, Massachusetts on February 14, 1766. He studied law with Joshua Atherton of Amherst, New Hampshire, where his fellow students included William Plumer, who remained a lifelong friend.  Coleman was admitted to the bar, and moved to Greenfield, Massachusetts, where he became the town's first lawyer and co-founder of the Impartial Intelligencer newspaper, now known as The Greenfield Recorder. He moved to New York City around 1794 and practiced law at one point with Aaron Burr.

In 1801, he began The New York Evening Post, and he served as editor of the paper from 1801 to 1829.

Coleman was elected a member of the American Antiquarian Society in 1815.

Duels and other run-ins
In early 1804, Coleman killed New York harbormaster Captain Jeremiah Thompson in a duel.  The duel took place at "Love Lane", the path of which is now Twenty-First Street in Manhattan between Sixth and Eighth Avenues.

The duel arose from a dispute between Coleman and James Cheetham (1772–1810), editor of the rival New York paper American Citizen. When Cheetham claimed that Coleman was the father of a mulatto child, Coleman challenged Cheetham to a duel.  The duel did not occur however, because others intervened to stop it including Judge Brockholst Livingston.  Thereafter, Thompson, a friend of Cheetham, claimed that the duel had only been stopped because Coleman had revealed it publicly before it had occurred, because he was a coward. Coleman thereupon challenged Thompson to a duel. On the appointed evening it was quite dark, and the parties reportedly had to approach a few steps closer after taking initial shots, in order to see each other. At that point, Thompson was shot and was claimed to have exclaimed "I've got it" as he fell into the snow. A physician who had been brought to the scene confirmed it was a mortal wound, and Thompson was left at the entrance of his sister's residence, and those involved rang the bell and quickly left. Thompson refused to reveal Coleman's name or any other details, and simply said that he had been treated fairly. The details of the duel were not revealed for many years.  After the event however, Cheetham was more careful in his editorial treatment of Coleman.

Later that same year, Coleman's friend Alexander Hamilton was killed by Aaron Burr in perhaps the most famous duel in U.S. history. Coleman compiled a book of materials regarding the duel and Hamilton's death.

In 1819, after publishing a highly negative story about prominent state official and Democrat Henry B. Hagerman, Coleman was viciously attacked by Hagerman and left bleeding in the street.  It took many weeks for Coleman to recover from the beating, and he suffered from bouts of paralysis for the remainder of his life.  Coleman later recovered $4,000 in a civil suit against Hagerman, considered a large award for the time.

Death
Coleman died of a stroke on July 13, 1829, and was succeeded at the Post by William Cullen Bryant.

References

External links
 

1766 births
1829 deaths
19th-century American newspaper editors
American duellists
New York Post people
Members of the American Antiquarian Society
Lawyers from Boston
Lawyers from New York City
Phillips Academy alumni
19th-century American lawyers